Maschwanden is a village in the district of Affoltern in the canton of Zürich in Switzerland.

History

Maschwanden is first mentioned in 1189 as Maswondon.  The Baron of Eschenbach owned a castle and the village, near the current municipality, at that time.  However, in 1308 Walter von Eschenbach was present at the regicide of King Albert I of Germany near Windisch.  In response to the murder, in 1309 the castle and village were both destroyed and never rebuilt.  The ruins were located on a hill south-west of the modern village, which mostly consisted of gravel and was carried off during the 19th and 20th century.

Geography
Of this area, 61.5% is used for agricultural purposes, while 24.1% is forested. Of the rest of the land, 8.3% is settled (buildings or roads) and the remainder (6%) is non-productive (rivers, glaciers or mountains).

The municipality is located on the east banks of the Reuss River near the confluence of the Lorze River into the Reuss.

Demographics
, 4.5% of the population was made up of foreign nationals. Over the last 10 years the population has grown at a rate of 12.8%. Most of the population speaks German  (97.8%), with Portuguese being second most common ( 0.7%) and Italian being third ( 0.5%).

In the 2007 election the most popular party was the SVP which received 45% of the vote.  The next three most popular parties were the SPS (21.4%), the CSP (14.6%) and the Green Party (7.2%).

The age distribution of the population is children and teenagers 19 years and younger make up 27.5% of the population, while adults 20 to 64 years old make up 59.3% and seniors over 64 years old make up 13.2%.  About 81.4% of the population (between ages 25 and 64) have completed either non-mandatory upper secondary education or additional higher education (either university or a Fachhochschule).

Maschwanden has an unemployment rate of 0.36%.  , there were 61 people employed in the primary economic sector and about 24 businesses involved in this sector.  12 people are employed in the secondary sector and there are 4 businesses in this sector.  49 people are employed in the tertiary sector, with 19 businesses in this sector.
The historical population is given in the following table:

References

External links

 Official website 
 

Municipalities of the canton of Zürich